The 1897 municipal election was held December 13, 1897.  This was the last election to elect a full town council for a one-year term, as the 1898 election was conducted under a staggered system.  The election was to elect the town council (consisting of a mayor and six aldermen, each elected for a one-year term), five trustees for the public school division and four trustees for the separate school division.

Voter turnout

Voter turnout figures for the 1897 municipal election are no longer available.

Results

(bold indicates elected, italics indicate incumbent)

Mayor

William S. Edmiston was acclaimed as mayor.

Aldermen
Election conducted using Plurality block voting, with each voter casting as many as six votes.
Those elected were to serve one-year terms.

Elected
 Kenneth McLeod - 86
 James Ross - 80
 Joseph Henri Picard - 80
 Thomas Hourston - 75
 Alfred Jackson (A.E. Jackson) - 75
 William Humberstone - 74

Not elected
 Phillip Heiminck - 60
 J V E Carpenter - 58
 Joseph Gariépy - 57

Public school trustees

Thomas Bellamy, R J W Mathers, A G Randall, James Ross, and Hedley C. Taylor were elected.  Detailed results are no longer available.

Separate (Catholic) school trustees

N D Beck, Sandy Larue, Antonio Prince, and Georges Roy were elected.  Detailed results are no longer available.

References

City of Edmonton: Edmonton Elections

1897
1897 elections in Canada
1897 in Alberta